"This Time I'll Be Sweeter" is a soul ballad written by Haras Fyre (professionally known as Pat Grant) and Gwen Guthrie.

Early versions
The first release of "This Time I'll Be Sweeter" was as the B-side of the May 1975 Arista Records single release "Love Blind" by Martha Reeves; both sides of Reeves' single were produced by Bert De Coteaux and Tony Silvester who had hired composers Gwen Guthrie and Haras Fyre (pka Patrick/Pat Grant) as staff writers for the De Coteaux/Silvester company Penumbra Music in 1973. The Martha Reeves version of "This Time I'll Be Sweeter" was included on Reeves' 1976 album release The Rest of My Life. 

De Couteaux and Silvester also produced the version by Linda Lewis on her album Not a Little Girl Anymore released - also on Arista - in June 1975. Lewis' version - whose chorale consisted of the song's co-writer Gwen Guthrie with Deniece Williams - was released as the album's lead single in the US. It was later issued in the UK in September 1976 as the follow-up to the hit song "Baby I'm Yours", just missing the UK Top 50, peaking at #51. The track did afford Lewis a hit in Brazil ranking at #65 on that nation's ranking of the Top 100 singles for the year 1976. 

"This Time I'll Be Sweeter" was also featured on the 1976 album release by Marlena Shaw, Just a Matter of Time, a Bert DeCoteaux/Tony Silvester production. Shaw's version of "This Time I'll Be Sweeter" has been cited by the song's co-writer Pat Grant/Haras Fyre (also the bassist on several of the song's earliest versions) as being the original version of the song, as Fyre asserts that Shaw's recording of "This Time I'll Be Sweeter" dates from 1974. 

Roberta Flack recorded "This Time I'll Be Sweeter" in the 1973-1974 sessions for her 1975 album release Feel Like Makin' Love with Gwen Guthrie contributing background vocals to the track, which would be held over for release on Flack's 1977 album Blue Lights in the Basement.

Angela Bofill version

"This Time I'll Be Sweeter" had its highest profile incarnation as the debut single for Angela Bofill who recorded "This Time I'll Be Sweeter" for her Angie album. Bofill's producer Dave Grusin knew of the song due to his being acquainted with its composer Gwen Guthrie who he had frequently utilized as a session singer (Guthrie was a member of the chorale featured on the Angie album although the chorale is not featured on "This Time I'll Be Sweeter"). Co-released with the Angie album on 21 November 1978, Bofill's "This Time I'll Be Sweeter" single would reach #23 on the Hot Soul Singles chart: although Bofill would subsequently score higher-placing Soul chart hits, "This Time I'll Be Sweeter" would remain her only single to approach the Billboard Hot 100, bubbling under at #104. A duet version with Sharon Cuneta was released and performed in the 1983 movie Friends in Love. Bofill's live version of the "This Time I'll Be Sweeter" is featured on her 2006 Live from Manila concert album.

Other versions
Overall there are more than eighty recorded versions of "This Time I'll Be Sweeter" including those by Wendy Alleyne, Teresa Carpio, Sharon Cuneta, Will Downing,  Isaac Hayes,  AC Kelly, La India ("Te daré dulzura"), Melveen Leed, Maysa, Kevin McCord, Tillie Moreno, Buddy Montgomery, Nia Peeples, Rachelle Ann Go, Jack Radics and "5AZ1":

 Deniece Williams - who with Gwen Guthrie sang back-up on the 1975 Linda Lewis version - recorded "This Time I'll Be Sweeter" for her 2007 album Love, Niecy Style.
 "This Time I'll Be Sweeter" was also covered by Filipino singer Rachelle Ann Go as her carrier single from her 2009 album Falling in Love.
 On 8 November 2017, a Filipino film entitled This Time I'll Be Sweeter was released featuring "This Time I'll Be Sweeter" - as performed by 5azi - as its title song.

References

1975 singles
1978 singles
La India songs
Songs written by Gwen Guthrie
Songs written by Haras Fyre
Angela Bofill songs
1975 songs
1970s ballads
Rhythm and blues ballads
Soul ballads